ψ-Tectorigenin is an O-methylated isoflavone, a type of flavonoid. It can be isolated from Belamcanda chinensis, Dalbergia sissoo. It can also be isolated from the bacterium Nocardiopsis sp, and from the mold Stemphilium sp. No. 644.

References 

O-methylated isoflavones
Resorcinols